Samarendra Nath Maulik (25 December 1881 in Tamluk – 9 July 1950 in Chelsea) was an Indian entomologist who worked at the Natural History Museum, London and specialized in the systematics of the leaf beetles. He worked briefly at the University of Calcutta as a professor of Zoology. A structure on the hind femur, particularly of flea beetles, and used in their leaping motion has sometimes been called as "Maulik's organ".

Life and work 
Maulik was born in Tamluk, West Bengal. He studied physics, chemistry and mathematics at St Xavier's College, Calcutta but later became interested in biology from 1902 and started working in Assam, experimenting on the breeding of insects, particularly those feeding on tea plants. He then spent some time at the Forest Research Institute in Dehra Dun and at the Indian Museum under Nelson Annandale. He then went to live in Cambridge to study biology and then joined Imperial College to study entomology. After this he worked at the British Museum (Natural History) where he studied leaf beetles (Chrysomelidae and from 1919 he published on the Indian members of the group contributing to The Fauna of British India, Including Ceylon and Burma series.

In 1919 he went briefly to work at the newly established department of zoology at Calcutta University, becoming the first professor of zoology there. The department had just one student in 1919, Durgadas Mukherji. Finding life uncongenial, Maulik returned to England in two years to continue his work on the Chrysomelidae. He also examined fossil insects from the Devonian period in Rhynie Chert along with Stanley Hirst. Maulik suggested that most clades within the Chrysomelidae where restricted to their host-plant lineages (termed as "Maulik's Law" by Pierre Jolivet) and he identified the apodeme on the tip of the hind-femora, the so-called "Maulik's organ", as a defining character of the flea-beetles, Alticinae ("Halticinae" in his time). He studied Chrysomelidae from around the world and described a very large number of taxa, nearly 56 genera and 300 species. He also worked on a few other groups outside of the Chrysomelidae including on the Neuroptera in collaboration with F. H. Gravely. A flea-beetle Maulika was named in his honour by Basu & Sengupta in 1980. He died of heart disease at his home in Chelsea at the age of 68.

Maulik wrote on a wide range of topics, particularly in the Bangalore Mail and was known for his forceful but logical explication of ideas. Titles of his essays included 'Science and Art', 'Education', 'Mysticism in Man', 'Ecology of Literature', and 'Why Scandal-Mongering is a Social Institution'. He held liberal views and was an atheist. A dry-brush sketch of him made by the artist Malcolm Osborne was exhibited at the Spring Exhibition of Royal Academy in 1932.

Publication list 
Maulik's publications include:

References

External links
 

Coleopterists
Indian entomologists
1881 births
1950 deaths
Indian atheists
Academic staff of the University of Calcutta
Naturalists of British India
People from Tamluk
20th-century Indian zoologists
Scientists from West Bengal